Woods or The Woods may refer to:

Common meanings 
 Woodland
 Forest

 Wood, solid material from trees or shrubs

Places

United States 
 Woods, Kentucky
 Woods, Oregon
 Woods, a municipality in Liberty County, Florida
 The Woods, a neighborhood in Shenandoah, Louisiana

Elsewhere 
 Woods, Ontario, an area of Carling, Ontario, Canada
 Woods, South Australia, an area of Owen
 The Woods, a locality in Sandwell, England

Culture

Film 
 The Woods (2006 film), a film directed by Lucky McKee
 The Woods (2011 film), a film directed by Matthew Lessner
 The Woods, a false working title used for the 2016 film Blair Witch (film)

Music 
 The Woods (album), 2005 album by Sleater-Kinney
 Woods (band), American folk-rock band from New York
 "Woods", a song by Fireworks from their album Oh, Common Life, 2014
 "Woods", a song by Mac Miller from his album Circles, 2020

Other uses in culture 
 The Woods, 2007 novel by Harlan Coben
 The Woods (play), 1977 play by David Mamet
 The Woods (comic), a graphic novel by James Tynion IV and Michael Dialynas
 The Woods (miniseries), a Polish web television miniseries

Sports 
 Another name for lawn bowls
 Wood (golf), a type of golf club

Other uses 
 Woods Motor Vehicle, an American manufacturer of electric automobiles between 1899 and 1916
 Woods (surname), a family name
 Sacred woods, another term for sacred grove

See also
 
 
 Woods County, Oklahoma
 Woods Estate (disambiguation)
 Wood (disambiguation)
 Wold (disambiguation)
 Justice Woods (disambiguation)